Evening Journal may refer to:

 Evening Journal (Adelaide) (1869–1912), in Adelaide, Australia; later The News
 The News Journal, in Wilmington, Delaware, United States
 New York Evening Journal (1896–1937), merged into the New York Journal-American
 Alabama Journal, United States